Rod McCormack (born 13 February 1963) is an Australian record producer, musician and songwriter. McCormack is responsible for many high selling and award-winning albums and was named Country Music Awards of Australia Producer of the year in 2004, 2008 and again in 2010. He has written over 30 number-one country hits and has produced albums for Gina Jeffreys, Paul Kelly, Troy Cassar-Daley, Adam Harvey, Beccy Cole amongst others.

He was part of the band The Wheel between 1995 and 1999. In 2000, McCormack married Australian country singer Gina Jeffreys.
In September 2019, McCormack released his first solo studio album, Fingerprints.

Discography

Awards

CMAA Awards
These annual awards have been presented since 1973 and have been organised by Country Music Association of Australia (CMAA) from 1993, to "encourage, promote and recognise excellence in Australian country music recording". From that time the recipient's trophy has been a Golden Guitar.
 
 (wins only)
|-
| 1995 || "Little Rock Gettaway"   (with Mick Albeck) || Instrumental of the Year || 
|-
| 1996 || "Cut to the Chase"   (with Mick Albeck) || Instrumental of the Year || 
|-
|2002 || Workin' Overtime by Adam Harvey  (produced by Rod McCormack) || Album of the Year || 
|-
|2008 || I'm Doin' Alright by Adam Harvey  (produced by Rod McCormack) || Album of the Year || 
|-
|2010 || I Love This Place by Troy Cassar-Daley  (co-produced by Rod McCormack) || Album of the Year || 
|-
|2012|| Falling Into Place by Adam Harvey  (produced by Rod McCormack) || Album of the Year || 
|-
|2014 || Black Coffee by Lachlan Bryan and The Wildes  (co-produced by Rod McCormack) || Alternative Album of the Year || 
|-
|2020 || "Timeless Traveller" || Instrumental of the Year || 
|-

Tamworth Songwriters Awards
The Tamworth Songwriters Association (TSA) is an annual songwriting contest for original country songs, awarded in January at the Tamworth Country Music Festival. They commenced in 1986.
 (wins only)
|-
| 2002
| "Too Strong to Break" by Beccy Cole, Rod McCormack and Rick Price
| Contemporary Song of the Year
| 
|-

References 

 

1983 births
Living people
Australian record producers
Australian singer-songwriters
21st-century Australian musicians
Australian country musicians